The 1981 Orange Bowl was the 47th edition of the college football bowl game, played at the Orange Bowl in Miami, Florida, on Thursday, January 1. Part of the 1980–81 bowl game season, it matched the fourth-ranked Oklahoma Sooners of the Big Eight Conference and the independent #2 Florida State Seminoles.

Favored Oklahoma rallied to win by a point, 18–17.

Teams

The game was a rematch of the previous year, and both teams were on seven-game winning streaks.

Oklahoma

The Sooners lost two non-conference games, to Stanford at home, and rival Texas in Dallas. They were champions of the Big Eight Conference for the eighth consecutive year. This was Oklahoma's twelfth Orange Bowl appearance, fourth consecutive, and fifth in six seasons.

Florida State

The Seminoles' only blemish was a one-point loss at rival Miami in late September. This was Florida State's second major bowl appearance, after playing in last year's edition.

Game summary
After a scoreless first quarter, Ricky Williams put Florida State ahead with his touchdown run, and Oklahoma countered with a long field goal by Mike Keeling; the Seminoles led 7–3 at halftime.

To start the second half, Oklahoma drove 78 yards on twelve plays, and halfback David Overstreet scored from four yards out to take a 10–7 lead. A short field goal by Bill Capece tied the game at ten for the last tally of the third quarter.

Four minutes into the final quarter, cornerback Bobby Butler recovered a botched punt snap in the end zone to give the Seminoles a 17–10 lead. With 3:19 remaining, Oklahoma's fate laid in the hands of senior quarterback J. C. Watts, who had turned the ball over three times on fumbles. He led the Sooners on a 78-yard drive, culminating with an eleven-yard touchdown pass to wide receiver Steve Rhodes with 1:33 remaining. Down by a point, Oklahoma opted for the two-point conversion attempt, and Watts completed a pass to tight end Forrest Valora in the end zone for a one-point lead. Florida State tried to counter back, but Capece's 62-yard field goal attempt fell short, and the Sooners were victorious.

Scoring
First quarter
No scoring
Second quarter
Florida State – Ricky Williams 10-yard run (Bill Capece kick)
Oklahoma – Mike Keeling 53-yard field goal
Third quarter
Oklahoma – David Overstreet 4-yard run (Keeling kick) 
Florida State – Capece 19-yard field goal
Fourth quarter
Florida State – Bobby Butler fumble recovery of punt snap (Capece kick)
Oklahoma – Steve Rhodes 11-yard pass from J. C. Watts (Forrest Valora pass from Watts)

Statistics
{| class=wikitable style="text-align:center"
! Statistics !! style="background:#841617; color:#ffffff"|  Oklahoma    !! style="background:#540115; color:#cdc092"|Florida State
|-
| First Downs || 18|| 23
|-
| Rushes–yards|| 55–156|| 60–212
|-
| Passing yards || 128|| 51
|-
| Passes (C–A–I) || 7–12–0|| 11–15–0 
|-
| Total Offense || 67–284|| 75–263 
|-
| Return yards || 18 || −6
|-
|Punts–average ||2–37.0|| 4–42.5
|-
|Fumbles–lost ||7–5|| 1–0
|-
|Turnovers|| 5|| 0
|-
|Penalties–yards ||4–32|| 5–58
|}

Aftermath
Oklahoma climbed to third in the final AP poll and Florida State fell to fifth.

The Sooners' next Orange Bowl was four years later, the first of four consecutive; the Seminoles did not return for twelve years.

References

Orange Bowl
Orange Bowl
Florida State Seminoles football bowl games
Oklahoma Sooners football bowl games
January 1981 sports events in the United States
Orange